Kheyrabad (also Romanized as Kheyrābād, Khairābād, and Kheir Abad) is a village in Negar Rural District, in the Central District of Bardsir County, Kerman Province, Iran. At the 2006 census, its population was 77, in 21 families.

References 

Populated places in Bardsir County